The 2009–10 Winthrop Eagles men's basketball team represented Winthrop University during the 2009–10 college basketball season. This was head coach Randy Peele's third season at Winthrop. The Eagles competed in the Big South Conference and played their home games at Winthrop Coliseum. They finished the season 19–14, 12–6 in Big South play to finish third in the conference. They won the 2010 Big South Conference men's basketball tournament to receive the conference's automatic bid to the 2010 NCAA Division I men's basketball tournament. They were selected to play in the Opening Round game where they lost to Arkansas-Pine Bluff.

Roster
Source

Schedule and results

|-
!colspan=9 style=| Regular Season

|-
!colspan=9 style=| Big South tournament

|-
!colspan=9 style=| NCAA tournament

References

Winthrop
Winthrop
Winthrop Eagles men's basketball seasons
Winthrop Eagles
Winthrop Eagles